In baseball, a catcher is charged with a passed ball when he fails to hold or control a legally pitched ball that, with ordinary effort, should have been maintained under his control, and, as a result of this loss of control, the batter or a runner on base advances. A runner who advances due to a passed ball is not credited with a stolen base unless he breaks for the base before the pitcher begins his delivery. A passed ball may be scored when a runner on first, second, or third base reaches the next base on a bobble or missed catch by the catcher, or when the batter-runner reaches first base on an uncaught third strike (see also Strikeout).

The list of career leaders is dominated by players from the 19th century, when fielding equipment was very rudimentary; baseball gloves only began to steadily gain acceptance in the 1880s, and were not uniformly worn until the mid-1890s, resulting in a much lower frequency of defensive miscues. Other protective equipment for catchers was also gradually introduced; the first masks were developed in the late 1870s, with improvements in the 1890s, but shin guards were not introduced to the major leagues until 1907. The top 47 players in career passed balls all played primarily in the 19th century, with two-thirds playing their entire careers prior to 1894; only eight were active after 1900, and none were active after 1912.

Pop Snyder, who retired in 1891 with a record 877 games as a catcher, is the all-time leader in passed balls with 763, nearly four times as many as any catcher who began their career after 1915. Silver Flint, who ended his career in 1889, is second with 639, and holds the National League record of 602. Lance Parrish has the most passed balls (192) of any catcher after 1915, and holds the American League record of 158.

Key

List

Other Hall of Famers

Sources

Baseball-Reference.com

Passed balls leaders
Major League Baseball statistics